2300 Arena is a multipurpose indoor arena in Philadelphia, Pennsylvania, used primarily for professional wrestling, boxing, mixed martial arts, and concert events. Originally known as Viking Hall, the venue has since been named Alhambra Arena, The Arena and Asylum Arena. It was previously known unofficially as ECW Arena when it was home to Extreme Championship Wrestling from 1993 to 2001, and later XPW Arena when it was home to Xtreme Pro Wrestling from 2002 to 2003.

The venue has hosted major professional wrestling broadcasts including ECW Barely Legal (1997), DGUSA Enter the Dragon (2009–2010), ROH Final Battle (2015) and ROH Death Before Dishonor (2021). ESPN2 named it their Venue of the Year (2006) after it hosted a series of outstanding professional boxing bouts on Wednesday Night Fights, most notably Larry Mosley and Miguel Figueroa's 12-round majority draw for the vacant NABO Welterweight Championship.

Recognized as the birthplace of American hardcore wrestling, the venue has been home to the Hardcore Hall of Fame since 2002.

History

Planning and construction

The facility was originally a freight warehouse in South Philadelphia that was built in 1974. Rail tracks next to the building allowed trains to drop off freight for storage and then continue on to their destinations. The tracks were eventually paved over to become an extension of West Ritner Street, allowing West Ritner Street to intersect with South Swanson Street.

Elias Stein and Leon Silverman of the law firm Stein & Silverman Family Partnership, Inc. purchased the warehouse in 1986. The southern part of the facility was given the name Viking Hall when the South Philadelphia Viking Club, a local chapter of mummers, began utilizing it. They used the building for storage and to rehearse for the annual Mummers Parade. The Viking Club also staged midnight bingo games at the venue to raise funds for their organization. The northern part of the building was occupied by retail space, most notably a Forman Mills clothing store.

Opening and reception

The southern part of the building gained worldwide recognition when it served as ECW Arena, home of professional wrestling promotion Extreme Championship Wrestling (ECW) from May 1993 until the promotion's closure in April 2001. Sharing the same portion of the building with the South Philadelphia Viking Club, ECW often referred to the venue on-air as "The World's Most Famous Bingo Hall".

ECW referee John Finnegan reminisced about the building's arrangement in a July 2006 interview:

Paul Heyman commented in April 1998 as to whether ECW would run another pay-per-view event from the venue after the success of ECW Barely Legal:

ECW never ran another pay-per-view from the venue. The promotion gradually moved its shows away from Philadelphia, running only 6 events at the venue in 2000.

Alterations

Following the closure of Extreme Championship Wrestling in April 2001, several Philadelphia based professional wrestling promotions began running shows at the venue. Combat Zone Wrestling (CZW) ran shows at the building and referred to it as CZW Arena. Pro-Pain Pro Wrestling (3PW) ran shows at the building and referred to it as 3PW Arena. Ring of Honor (ROH) opted to run their shows at nearby Murphy Recreation Center, citing the need to establish their own legacy separate from ECW.

Controversy arose when Xtreme Pro Wrestling (XPW) signed an exclusive lease with the venue in December 2002 and renamed the building XPW Arena, preventing other promotions from utilizing it. Forced to relocate, CZW moved their shows to a new CZW Arena in Southwest Philadelphia, while 3PW moved their shows to Electric Factory.

In January 2003, the Pennsylvania State Athletic Commission banned barbed wire and light tubes from professional wrestling matches in response to violent XPW and CZW events at the venue.

The building's ownership evicted XPW from the venue in February 2003 after the promotion failed to make lease payments. CZW resumed running shows at the venue in March 2003, with 3PW returning in November 2003.

The building's name was officially changed to New Alhambra Sports & Entertainment Center in 2004, and was later shortened to New Alhambra Arena in 2006 and Alhambra Arena in 2008. The name was suggested by J. Russell Peltz, who began co-promoting professional boxing cards at the venue with Joe Hand, Sr. in May 2004. It paid homage to the original Alhambra Movie Theater in South Philadelphia that hosted boxing in the 1950s and 1960s.

New Jack was banned from the venue following an incident during a Pro Wrestling Xplosion show in September 2006 . He famously ordered Sprite at the venue's concession stand and was instead given 7 Up, prompting him to verbally harass the stand attendant and assault a member of the ring crew.

J. Russell Peltz and Joe Hand, Sr. announced in January 2009 that after a five-year partnership, they would stop promoting boxing cards at the venue and move their shows to The Blue Horizon. The venue was then renamed to The Arena by general manager Roger Artigiani. J. Russell Peltz and Joe Hand, Sr. later returned to promoting boxing cards at the venue after The Blue Horizon closed in June 2010.

Roger Artigiani announced in October 2010 that mixed martial arts group Asylum Fight League had purchased the naming rights to the venue and renamed it Asylum Arena.

Arena Operating, LLC (headed by Joanna Pang of the Trocadero Theatre) signed an exclusive lease with the venue in February 2012 with plans to renovate and convert it to a concert hall. The building's ownership evicted Arena Operating, LLC in April 2013 after Joanna Pang failed to complete her proposed renovations.

The venue reopened as 2300 Arena in December 2013. The name referenced its newly constructed entranceway at 2300 South Swanson Street, replacing the old entrance at 7 West Ritner Street.

Notable events

Professional wrestling
 

An NWA World Title Tournament at the venue in August 1994 ended with Shane Douglas throwing down the NWA World Heavyweight Championship and declaring himself ECW World Heavyweight Champion, effectively launching ECW as a national promotion.

ECW broadcast Barely Legal, their first live pay-per-view event from the venue in April 1997. The event was headlined by Terry Funk defeating Raven to become ECW World Heavyweight Champion. Immediately following the broadcast, the building lost power.

The final ECW show at the venue was Holiday Hell in December 2000, headlined by Steve Corino retaining his ECW World Heavyweight Championship against Justin Credible and The Sandman.

In June 2005, an unofficial ECW reunion show called Hardcore Homecoming: An Extreme Reunion drew a sell-out crowd and set a record gate for the venue with $135,000 in ticket sales. The Pennsylvania State Athletic Commission lifted their January 2003 ban on barbed wire for the main event between Sabu, Shane Douglas and Terry Funk.

Ring of Honor (ROH) debuted at the venue in March 2006 with Arena Warfare, a show featuring inter-promotional matches between the stars of ROH and Combat Zone Wrestling. The event was headlined by Samoa Joe defeating Colt Cabana and Christopher Daniels.

Impact Wrestling debuted at the venue in June 2006 with Hardcore War, a joint show with United Wrestling Federation (UWF). The event was headlined by America's Most Wanted, the NWA World Tag Team Champions, facing Team 3D and The James Gang in a non-title match.

The ECW brand of WWE ran a house show at the venue in June 2006, with tickets for the event selling out in under four minutes. Rob Van Dam successfully defended his WWE Championship in the main event against Kurt Angle.

Scenes from The Wrestler were shot at the venue during the Combat Zone Wrestling show 9 F'N Years in February 2008, with professional wrestler Necro Butcher having a prominent on-screen role in the film.

In February 2009, the venue began hosting regular television tapings for the Ring of Honor series Ring of Honor Wrestling. The first taping drew a sell-out crowd and was headlined by Bryan Danielson defeating Austin Aries.

Dragon Gate USA filmed their first pay-per-view event, Enter The Dragon at the venue in July 2009. The card was headlined by Open the Dream Gate Champion Naruki Doi defeating Shingo Takagi in a non-title match.

In September 2009, independent wrestler Matt Riot died following a Combat Zone Wrestling training session at the venue where he collapsed from a brain hemorrhage.

New Japan Pro-Wrestling (NJPW) concluded Invasion Tour 2011, their first ever tour of the United States, with an event at the venue in May 2011. The card was headlined by Togi Makabe defeating Rhino, and the undercard featured MVP defeating Toru Yano to become the inaugural IWGP Intercontinental Champion.

Chikara broadcast High Noon, their first live internet pay-per-view event from the venue in November 2011. Eddie Kingston defeated Mike Quackenbush in the main event to become the inaugural Chikara Grand Champion.

Prior to the renovations beginning, Evolve presented on live internet pay-per-view what was billed as the venue's final professional wrestling event, A Tribute to the Arena, on January 14, 2012. New Jack appeared at this event, ending his September 2006 ban from the venue.

The venue hosted the premiere screening of the unofficial ECW documentary Barbed Wire City in April 2013.

Extreme Rising promoted the first professional wrestling card at the newly renamed 2300 Arena in December 2013.

Ring of Honor and New Japan Pro Wrestling jointly presented War of the Worlds '15 at the venue over two consecutive nights in May 2015.

Ring of Honor broadcast Final Battle 2015 on live pay-per-view from the venue in December 2015, headlined by Jay Lethal retaining his ROH World Championship against AJ Styles.

Evolve 131 aired live on WWE Network from the venue in July 2019. Adam Cole successfully retained his NXT Championship in the main event against Akira Tozawa.

The VICE series Dark Side of the Ring: Confidential was filmed at the venue in December 2020.

Ring of Honor broadcast Death Before Dishonor XVIII on live pay-per-view from the venue in September 2021, headlined by Bandido retaining his ROH World Championship against Brody King, Demonic Flamita and EC3 in a Four-Way Elimination match.

Professional boxing

The final event prior to the venue closing was a Peltz Boxing Promotions card on January 21, 2012, that aired live on NBC Sports Network as the debut episode of Fight Night.

Mixed martial arts

Matrix Fights drew a sell-out crowd at the venue for their first mixed martial arts event in February 2010, featuring Cole Konrad on the undercard.

Concerts

The band New York Dolls headlined a concert at the venue on Valentine's Day in February 2008.

Other
Elvis Depressedly released an album named after the venue called New Alhambra in May 2015.

The Republican National Committee used the venue for its RNC at the DNC event in July 2016 to counter the Democratic National Convention at Wells Fargo Center.

Philly Fashion Week began hosting the runway portion of its biannual event at the venue in September 2016.

The Philadelphia Eagles received their Super Bowl rings following their victory at Super Bowl LII during a private ceremony at the venue in June 2018.

Promotional history

Concerts

These musicians have held headlining concerts at 2300 Arena.

Mixed martial arts

These mixed martial arts promotions have held events at 2300 Arena.

Professional boxing

These professional boxing promotions have held events at 2300 Arena.

Professional wrestling

These professional wrestling promotions have held events at 2300 Arena.

Training

These professional boxing and professional wrestling schools have held training sessions at 2300 Arena.

Tournament history

Amateur boxing
These amateur boxing tournaments have been held at 2300 Arena.

Professional wrestling

These professional wrestling tournaments have been held at 2300 Arena.

Records

This is a list of records set by both individuals and groups in various categories at 2300 Arena.

Amateur boxing

Most tournament wins: 4, Jesse Hart

Concerts

Most events: 3, Sapremia
First event: Peelander-Z, August 26, 2006
Longest event: 2 days, Hostile City Death Fest, July 4, 2009 and July 5, 2009

Mixed martial arts

Most matches: 3, Nah-Shon Burrell
Most events: 25, Cage Fury Fighting Championships
Highest attendance: 1,300, Matt Makowski vs. LeVon Maynard, February 27, 2010
First match: Daniel Matalla defeated Michael Colisto, October 17, 2009
Longest match: 5 rounds, Jason Norwood vs. Jeremiah Wells, August 17, 2018
Shortest match: 0:15, Brylan Van Artsdalen vs. Shane Hutchinson, June 11, 2010

Professional boxing

Most matches: 12, Mike Jones
Most events: 32, Peltz Boxing Promotions
Highest attendance: 1,433, Christian Carto vs. Victor Ruiz, February 8, 2019
First match: Earl Clark defeated Kevin Swain, September 24, 1993
Longest match: 12 rounds, Derek Ennis vs. Gabriel Rosado, July 30, 2010; Enrique Ornelas vs. Bronco McKart, August 10, 2007; Rogers Mtagwa vs. Aldo Valtierra, July 20, 2007; Demetrius Hopkins vs. Mario Ramos, March 3, 2006; Larry Mosley vs. Miguel Figueroa, March 3, 2006
Shortest match: 0:22, Derrick Webster vs. Obodai Sai, November 25, 2014

Professional wrestling

Most matches: 149, Ruckus
Most events: 136, Combat Zone Wrestling
Highest attendance: 1,850, Mike Awesome vs. Spike Dudley, January 15, 2000
First match: Road Warrior Hawk defeated Don E. Allen and The Samoan Warrior, May 14, 1993
Longest match: 1:04:00, Claudio Castagnoli, Eddie Kingston, Gran Akuma, Mike Quackenbush and The Colony (Fire Ant, Soldier Ant and Worker Ant) vs. Atsushi Ohashi, Daisuke Sekimoto, Jaki Numazawa, Katsumasa Inoue, Ryuji Ito, Shinya Ishikawa and Yuji Okabayashi, October 19, 2008
Shortest match: 0:09, The Sandman vs. Chad Austin, March 4, 1994; Tommy Dreamer and Johnny Gunn vs. Johnny Hotbody and Tony Stetson, November 13, 1993
Most tournament wins: 4, Claudio Castagnoli

Awards
1994 - Best Weekly Television Show by Wrestling Observer Newsletter - ECW Hardcore TV
1995 - Best Weekly Television Show by Wrestling Observer Newsletter - ECW Hardcore TV
1996 - Best Weekly Television Show by Wrestling Observer Newsletter - ECW Hardcore TV
2006 - Venue of the Year by ESPN2 boxing program Wednesday Night Fights
2007 - Best of Philly: Sports Venue by the magazine Philadelphia
2008 - Best of Philly: Guys' Night Out by the magazine Philadelphia
2009 - Best Major Show by Wrestling Observer Newsletter - DGUSA Enter the Dragon, July 25, 2009
2010 - Best Weekly Television Show by Wrestling Observer Newsletter - Ring of Honor Wrestling
2010 - Briscoe Award - Philly Fight of the Year - Derek Ennis vs. Gabriel Rosado, July 30, 2010
2011 - Briscoe Award - Philly Fight of the Year - Juan Rodriguez, Jr. vs. Greg Hackett, July 29, 2011
2012 - Briscoe Award - Philly Fight of the Year - Bryant Jennings vs. Maurice Byarm, January 21, 2012
2015 - Briscoe Award - Philly Fight of the Year - Amir Mansour vs. Joey Dawejko, May 8, 2015
2016 - Briscoe Award - Philly Fight of the Year - Dashon Johnson vs. Jesse Hart, March 18, 2016
2017 - Briscoe Award - Philly Fight of the Year - Kermit Cintrón vs. Tyrone Brunson, June 24, 2017
2018 - Briscoe Award - Philly Fight of the Year - Brandon Robinson vs. Kalvin Henderson, December 7, 2018

Hardcore Hall of Fame

Banners commemorating the careers of professional wrestlers and wrestling personalities who contributed to the history of 2300 Arena are permanently on display at the venue.

Inductees

Ceremony dates

References

External links

Official website 
2300 Arena on BoxRec 
2300 Arena on Internet Wrestling Database
2300 Arena on WrestlingData.com

1993 establishments in Pennsylvania
Boxing venues in Philadelphia
Extreme Championship Wrestling
Indoor arenas in Pennsylvania
Mixed martial arts venues in the United States
Music venues completed in 1993
Music venues in Philadelphia
Professional wrestling in Philadelphia
South Philadelphia
Sports venues completed in 1993
Sports venues in Philadelphia
Wrestling venues in Pennsylvania